The , often abbreviated , was a Japanese policing organization, established within the Home Ministry in 1911, for the purpose of carrying out high policing, domestic criminal investigations, and control of political groups and ideologies deemed to threaten the public order of the Empire of Japan. As the civilian counterpart to the military police forces of the Kenpeitai (army) and of the Tokkeitai (navy), the Tokkō's functions were criminal investigation and counter-espionage.

History
The High Treason Incident of 1910 was the stimulus for the establishment of the Tokkō under the aegis of the Home Ministry. With the Russian Revolution, unrest at home due to the Rice Riots of 1918, increase in strikes and labor unrest from the labor movement, and Samil Uprising in Korea, the Tokkō was greatly expanded under the administration of Hara Takashi, and subsequent prime ministers. The Tokkō was charged with suppressing "dangerous thoughts" that could endanger the state. It was primarily concerned with anarchism, communism, socialism, and the growing foreign population within Japan, but its scope gradually increased to include religious groups, pacifists, student activists, liberals, and ultrarightists.

After the passage of the Peace Preservation Law of 1925, the power of the Tokkō was expanded tremendously, and it expanded to include branches in every Japanese prefecture, major city, and overseas locations with a large Japanese population (including Shanghai, London and Berlin). In the late 1920s and 1930s, the Tokkō launched a sustained campaign to destroy the Japanese Communist Party with several waves of mass arrests of known members, sympathizers and suspected sympathizers (March 15 incident).

The Tokkō was composed of six departments (Special Police Work, Foreign Surveillance, Koreans in Japan, Labor Relations, Censorship, Arbitration). In 1927, a sub-bureau was added, the Thought Section of the Criminal Affairs Bureau, to deal with the study and suppression of subversive ideologies. The Tokkō made use of both uniformed and non-uniformed officers, along with a large network of informants. These informants were often undercover officers infiltrating suspect organizations and acting as agents provocateur, or voluntary informants from Tonarigumi neighborhood associations. Counter-espionage activities also included monitoring external telephone and radio communications inside or outside Japan and nearby areas.

By 1936, the Tokkō had arrested 59,013 people, of whom 5000 had been brought to trial; about half of those received prison sentences.  The Tokkō was abolished in October 1945 by the Allied Occupation authorities. This directly led to prince Naruhiko Higashikuni's resignation as prime minister.

Principal agents and officers
 Genki Abe

Notable cases involving the Tokkō
Investigation of the Sorge Spy Ring.
Death by torture of the Hokkaido writer Takiji Kobayashi

See also 
 Kempeitai
 Tokubetsu Keisatsutai
 Japanese dissidence during the Shōwa period
 Political repression in Imperial Japan
 Police services of the Empire of Japan
 Gestapo
 Organization for Vigilance and Repression of Anti-Fascism
 List of historical secret police organizations

References

Bibliography

Further reading

Government agencies disestablished in 1945
1945 disestablishments in Japan
Defunct law enforcement agencies of Japan
Political repression in Japan
Politics of the Empire of Japan
Secret police
Defunct Japanese intelligence agencies